KMMS may refer to:

 KMMS (AM), a radio station (1450 AM) licensed to serve Bozeman, Montana, United States
 KMMS-FM, a radio station (94.7 FM) licensed to serve Bozeman, Montana